Dalio Memić (born March 21, 1990 in Derventa) is a Bosnian footballer  who currently plays for SV Unter-Flockenbach.

He has spent the majority of his career in the German lower leagues.

References

External links
Profile at Wikiwaldhof.

Profile at Footballtransfers.

1990 births
Living people
People from Derventa
Association football defenders
Bosnia and Herzegovina footballers
Bosnia and Herzegovina under-21 international footballers
SV Waldhof Mannheim players
1. FC Nürnberg II players
Kecskeméti TE players
FK Velež Mostar players
Regionalliga players
Nemzeti Bajnokság I players
Premier League of Bosnia and Herzegovina players
Bosnia and Herzegovina expatriate footballers
Expatriate footballers in Germany
Bosnia and Herzegovina expatriate sportspeople in Germany
Expatriate footballers in Hungary
Bosnia and Herzegovina expatriate sportspeople in Hungary